DNA Family Secrets is a British television series which began airing on BBC Two in March 2021. The programme is presented by Stacey Dooley and geneticist, Professor Turi King, and uses the latest DNA technology to solve family mysteries around ancestry, missing relatives and genetic disease.  The second series began airing on 11 May 2022.

Synopsis 
Presented by Dooley and King, the series sees Dooley meeting people "across the UK who want to unlock the mysteries hidden in their genetic code". Each episode follows three people – two of these trying to find out about their family history or ancestry, and another who is seeking to find answers about a genetic disease in the family. Dooley and King work with a large team of genealogists, social workers, and doctors to reveal unknown ancestry, find missing relatives and detect genetic disease before it's too late.

Episodes

Series overview

Series 1 (2021)

Series 2 (2022)

Reception 

The series has received positive reviews both on social media and in print.  Stuart Jeffries of The Guardian praised the series, calling it “a touching, timely portrait of mixed-race Britain”, saying the “show doesn't need celebrities to gild its drama".

Rachael Sigee of Inews wrote "you'd have to be cynical not to be moved by this reunion series", and that "Stacey Dooley’s new genealogy series was no less heartwarming for having to take place over Zoom".

Sara Wallis of The Mirror gave it a positive review, writing that “it makes for gripping TV”, “emotional, with fascinating DNA facts”, with results delivered by King with “wonderful empathy”.

Lucy Lethbridge of The Tablet praised the show, saying "If I were going to rattle the skeletons in my family's closet on primetime television, there are few people I would rather do it with than Stacey Dooley".

Paul Whitelaw of The Courier called it a "poignant genealogy series" before going on to say "Dooley is a good choice of host, she's likeable and empathetic, but the star of the show is Professor Turi King, who explains the science and gently guides the contributors through the entire process. She radiates kindness".

Jane Rackham of the Radio Times said the series has "an interesting twist that taps into our fascination with our past".

References

External links
 

BBC television documentaries about history
BBC television documentaries about science
2021 British television series debuts
Genetics in the United Kingdom
Stacey Dooley
Works about genetics